The Movement of Socialist Left (MES) was a Portuguese socialist party, founded shortly after the democratic Carnation Revolution.

The party has its roots in a group of Progressive Christians and Radical Socialists that abandoned the Portuguese Democratic Movement/Democratic Electoral Commissions in 1970, still during the dictatorial regime led by Marcello Caetano. In 1974, the initial group was joined by a group dissidents from the Socialist Party.

The party only participated in two elections, both parliamentary elections, in 1975 and 1976, gathering 1.0% and 0.6% in each election, respectively.

Among the Party's top figures were César Oliveira, Jorge Sampaio, João Cravinho, Ferro Rodrigues and Augusto Mateus. The majority of the Party's members would later join the Socialist Party, Jorge Sampaio would become the President of Portugal in 1996 and Ferro Rodrigues would become the leader of the Socialist Party and later Speaker of the Assembly of the Republic.

During its short existence the MES published several newspapers and magazines, such as: Esquerda Socialista, Poder Popular, Acção Sindical, Informação Militante and A Luta Continua.

Electoral Results 

(source: Portuguese Electoral Commission) 

Defunct political parties in Portugal
Political parties with year of disestablishment missing
Political parties with year of establishment missing
1974 establishments in Portugal
Political parties established in 1974
Socialist parties in Portugal